Hand games are games played using only the hands of the players. Hand games exist in a variety of cultures internationally, and are of interest to academic studies in ethnomusicology and music education. Hand games are used to teach music literacy skills and socio-emotional learning in elementary music classrooms internationally.

Examples of hand games
 Chopsticks (sticks)
 Clapping games
 Mercy
 Morra (finger counting)
 Odds and evens
 Pat-a-cake and variations:
 Mary Mack
 Red hands (or hand-slap game)
 Rock paper scissors
 Thumb war (or thumb wrestling)
 "Where are your keys?" (language acquisition game)

Less strictly, the following may be considered hand games:
 Bloody knuckles
 Fingers (drinking game)
 Jacks
 Knife game
 Spellbinder
 Stick gambling
 String games, such as cat's cradle

Reference